Maddy Morphosis is the stage name of Daniel Truitt, a drag performer most known for competing on season 14 of RuPaul's Drag Race. He is the show's first openly heterosexual male contestant.

Early life 
Maddy Morphosis is from Fayetteville, Arkansas and worked at Target before appearing on Drag Race.

Career 
Maddy Morphosis has been doing drag since 2017 and describes herself as "Arkansas's most overrated drag queen". Her name is a play on the word "metamorphosis". Maddy Morphosis competed on season 14 of RuPaul's Drag Race as the first straight, cisgender male contestant to appear on the show. Addressing the criticism of his casting, he said that he started doing drag after high school because it was "a safe space for me to explore my own gender identity... For anyone saying that I’m representing an underrepresented group, I appreciate you, but straight men are not a persecuted and excluded group within the drag community." Maddy Morphosis' entrance look on the first episode of Drag Race was inspired by Guy Fieri. Sam Damshenas of Gay Times wrote, "Maddy immediately won over viewers due to her sheer respect for drag and LGBTQ+ culture, as well as her jaw-dropping runway presentations." Maddy Morphosis received the Golden Boot award during the reunion episode, and wore an Elvis Presley-inspired outfit during the season finale.

Personal life
Maddy Morphosis' partner Jennifer Standridge is also a drag performer, known as Miss Liza. Maddy Morphosis identifies as heterosexual and cisgender, and uses the pronouns she/her when in drag. Maddy Morphosis has said, "I identify as a cisgender straight man, but I'm gender non-conforming in my presentation."

Filmography

Television

Web series

Music videos

Awards and nominations

See also 

 List of people from Fayetteville, Arkansas

References

External links
 

Living people
American drag queens
People from Fayetteville, Arkansas
RuPaul's Drag Race contestants
Year of birth missing (living people)